Area 8 can refer to:

 Area 8 (Nevada National Security Site)
 Brodmann area 8